The Expanse is a series of science fiction novels (and related novellas and short stories) by James S. A. Corey, the joint pen name of authors Daniel Abraham and Ty Franck. The first novel, Leviathan Wakes, was nominated for the Hugo Award for Best Novel in 2012. The complete series was nominated for the Hugo Award for Best Series in 2017. It later won, following its second nomination for the same award in 2020.

The book series is made up of nine novels, nine shorter works and a story collection book. The series was adapted for television by the Syfy Network, also under the title of The Expanse. When Syfy canceled the TV series after three seasons, Amazon acquired it, produced three more seasons, and streams all six seasons on Amazon Prime Video.

Series overview

Novels

Short stories and novellas

The book Memory's Legion is a collection of all eight short stories and novellas, except for The Last Flight of the Cassandra (which remains exclusive to the RPG). The collection includes authors' notes, and the final novella The Sins of Our Fathers, which is an epilogue to the series.

The series totals 5062 pages across the 9 novels, 467 across the other 9 short stories and novellas, and a total of 5529 pages in its entirety. The audiobook collections are approximately 178 hours, 17 hours, and 195 hours long respectively.

Audiobooks
All novels and short works except the RPG exclusive short story have been released as audiobooks, with Jefferson Mays as the narrator for the novels and short works that include Drive, The Butcher of Anderson Station, The Vital Abyss, Strange Dogs, Auberon, and The Sins of Our Fathers. Erik Davies was originally the narrator for the novellas The Churn and Gods of Risk; but both have been re-released with Jefferson Mays narrating them as of December 28, 2021. While most of Memory's Legion is narrated by Jefferson Mays, the author's note portions are narrated by Daniel Abraham and Ty Franck.

Summary of books
The Expanse is set in a future in which humanity has colonized much of the Solar System, but does not have interstellar travel. The G-force exerted during acceleration when travelling across the Solar System is debilitating without the use of special drugs. In the asteroid belt and beyond, tensions are rising between Earth's United Nations, Mars, and the outer planets. The residents of the outer planets have developed a creole language due to their physical isolation from Earth and Mars. The series initially takes place in the Solar System, using many real locations such as Ceres and Eros in the asteroid belt, several moons of Jupiter, with Ganymede and Europa the most developed, and small science bases as far out as Phoebe around Saturn and Titania around Uranus, as well as well-established domed settlements on Mars and the Moon.

The authors have suggested that The Expanse might well take place in the future of Andy Weir's novel The Martian. In support of this, they created a ship named the Mark Watney after the titular Martian. However, Andy Weir has publicly clarified that the reference was solely a fun reference.

As the series progresses, humanity gains access to thousands of new worlds by use of the ring, an artificially sustained Einstein-Rosen bridge or wormhole, created by a long-dead alien race. The ring in our solar system is two AU from the orbit of Uranus. Passing through it leads to a hub of starless space approximately one million kilometers across, with more than 1,300 other rings, each with a star system on the other side. In the center of the hub, which is also referred to as the "slow zone," an alien space station controls the gates and can also set instantaneous speed limits on objects inside the hub as a means of defense.

Characters

The story is told through multiple main point-of-view characters. There are two POV characters in the first book and four in books two through five. In the sixth and seventh books, the number of POV characters increases, with several characters having only one or two chapters. The eighth book returned to a more limited number with five. In the final ninth book, there is an increase in POVs with some chapters having multiple POV characters. Every book also begins and ends with a prologue and epilogue told from a unique character's perspective.

Crew of the Rocinante
The central characters are the crew of the Rocinante, a salvaged Martian naval gunship. The main crew consists of:
 James "Jim" R. Holden, the captain of the Rocinante, former UN Navy (UNN) officer; from Earth (an Earther).
 Naomi Nagata, chief engineer and executive officer; a Belter.
 Amos Burton, mechanic and general muscle; an Earther.
 Alex Kamal, pilot of the Rocinante, former Mars Congressional Republic Navy (MCRN) pilot; a Martian.

The Outer Planets
 Josephus "Joe" Aloisus Miller, a Belter who worked as a detective for the Ceres station security firm, Star Helix Security
 Juliette "Julie" Andromeda Mao, the oldest child of Earther plutocrat Jules-Pierre Mao, former pinnace racer and Outer Planets Alliance convert
 Frederick "Fred" Lucius Johnson, a former UN marine reviled as the "Butcher of Anderson Station" and now the leader of the OPA
 Dr. Praxidike "Prax" Meng, the chief botanist of the RMD-Southern soy farm project on Ganymede and father of Mei Meng
 Mei Meng, daughter of Prax
 Carlos "Bull" de Baca, a member of the OPA serving as chief security officer aboard the Behemoth
 Michio Pa, executive officer of the OPA ship Behemoth, later captain of the Free Navy ship Connaught
 Basia "Baz" Merton, a welder from Ganymede, later citizen of Ilus
 Manéo "Néo" Jung-Espinoza, a young Belter from Ceres
 Marco Inaros, a commander of Free Navy, a radical OPA branch
 Filip Inaros, a teenage member of the OPA, and later Free Navy, and son of Marco Inaros and Naomi Nagata
 Camina Drummer, chief of security of Tycho Station, later president of the Transport Union
 Jakulski, Roberts, Salis & Vandercaust, four techs, working for the Free Navy on Medina Station

Mars
 Roberta "Bobbie" W. Draper, Martian gunnery sergeant in the MCRN, of the 2nd Marine Expeditionary Force
 Fayez Okoye-Sarkis, A Geologist from Mars who worked on new colony worlds and later married Elvi Okoye
 Emil Sauveterre, the captain of the MCRN Barkeith
 Solomon Epstein, inventor of the "Epstein-Fusion Drive". He died testing his machine when he went into deep space with no way to get back.
 Kit Kamal, Son of Alex Kamal from his second marriage. He leaves Mars with his wife and son to the Nieuwestad system.

Earth
 Dmitri Havelock, a security contractor from Earth and former partner of Joe Miller
 Chrisjen Avasarala, the UN Assistant Undersecretary of Executive Administration, later UN Secretary General
 Clarissa "Claire" Melpomene Mao a.k.a. Melba Alzbeta Koh a.k.a. Peaches, a daughter of Jules-Pierre Mao, magnate of Mao-Kwikowski Mercantile from Luna; as Melba she is a licensed electrochemical technician. After forming a bond with her, Amos gives her the nickname Peaches.
 Dr. Elvi Okoye, a biologist from Earth, now a leading figure among citizens of the new colonies
 Rev. Dr. Annushka "Anna" Volovodov, a Methodist pastor at St. John's United on Europa and Earth
 Namono "Nono" Volovodov, wife of Anna, with whom she has a daughter, "Nami"

Laconia
 Winston Duarte, High Consul of the Laconian Empire, a defector from the Martian navy
 Teresa Duarte a.k.a. Tiny, the daughter and heir of the High Consul
 Paolo Cortázar, a former member of Protogen's nanoinformatics research division, he is now the lead researcher on Laconia
 Santiago Jilie Singh, a captain in the Laconian Imperial Navy and commander of the Gathering Storm
 Anton Trejo, High Admiral of the Laconian Imperial Navy and captain of the Heart of the Tempest
 Aliana Tanaka, a Colonel in the Laconian Imperial Navy and a former officer in the MCRN until defecting.
 Cara Bisset, a ten-year-old child who, with her parents, settled on Laconia and was resurrected by the planet's repair drones.

Other systems
  Jillian Houston, a member of the Underground and crew member of the Gathering Storm, she is from the Freehold system
 Unnamed Gunner, a member of the Underground faction that joined on Ganymede and participated in the Siege of Laconia on the gunship Rocinante, from Brazil Nova
 Ekko Levy, The captain of the Forgiveness from the planet Firdaws
 Marrel Imvic, a Linguist onboard the Musafir from the Dobridomov system

Inspiration and writing

Development 
Ty Franck began developing the world of The Expanse initially as the setting for a MMORPG and, after a number of years, for a tabletop roleplaying game. Daniel Abraham, who had authored a number of novels on his own, suggested, given the depth of the setting, that it could serve for the basis for a series of novels, noting: "People who write books don't do this much research."

The authors have stated that the series gets some of its inspirations from Fred Pohl's Gateway and the other Heechee books.
It has also been observed that there are similarities in the political and social setting of the series to Alfred Bester's classic science fiction novel The Stars My Destination.
Ty Franck has also stated Ridley Scott's Alien as having "the single largest influence on The Expanse."

Writing process
Franck writes all the Holden, Bobbie, and Anna chapters, while Abraham writes the Miller, Melba, Avasarala, Bull, and Prax chapters. The writers meet weekly to discuss upcoming chapters and swap completed chapters for the other to edit.

Narrative structure
The novels are written in third-person limited. Each chapter is told from the point of view of a character central to the story, while the prologue and epilogue are told by a recurring character or a one-off viewpoint. Most of the books employ four point-of-view characters (plus the prologue and epilogue viewpoints). Leviathan Wakes features two, Babylon's Ashes features sixteen, Persepolis Rising features eight, and Tiamat's Wrath features five. James Holden is the only character to be used as a viewpoint character in all nine novels.

Reception

Critical response
The series overall has been well received, with the first novel Leviathan Wakes being the highest praised. For Caliban's War, Wired.com's Geek Dad and Publishers Weekly both praised the novel. GeekDad cited the book's "believable human personalities and technology that is easily recognizable" as a highlight. Publishers Weekly gave Abaddon's Gate a starred review saying "series fans will find this installment the best yet." The same publication gave Cibola Burn a starred review and called it "splendid" and it "blends adventure with uncommon decency." The Expanse won the 2020 Hugo Award for Best Series.

Awards and nominations

Adaptations

Television series

The American television channel Syfy announced a straight-to-series commitment to a television adaptation of The Expanse in April 2014, ordering the production of ten hour-long episodes for a first season which premiered in December 2015.  six seasons consisting of a total of 62 episodes have been produced, with the final episode of each season sharing its name with the respective book. The series stars Thomas Jane as Josephus Miller and Steven Strait as Jim Holden. As for the other crew of the Rocinante, Dominique Tipper was cast as Naomi Nagata, Cas Anvar as Alex Kamal, and Wes Chatham as Amos Burton. The other major cast members are Shohreh Aghdashloo as Chrisjen Avasarala, Chad Coleman as Fred Johnson, and Florence Faivre as Julie Mao. In season 2, Frankie Adams joined the cast as Bobbie Draper.

Comics
Four digital comics based on the books and tying into the television series were published by ComiXology. The comics were written by James S. A. Corey, Hallie Lambert and Georgia Lee and illustrated by Huang Danlan, Triona Farrell, Juan Useche and Rahzzah. The Expanse: Origins reveals the untold backstories of the crew members of the Rocinante before the start of the series. All four comics were also released in print as a compilation titled The Expanse Vol. 1: Origins by  BOOM! Studios, which also featured a new story about Detective Miller.

A second series was also published by Boom and written by James S.A. Corey and Corinna Bechko, and illustrated by Alejandro Aragon, Francesco Segala and Ed Dukeshire. To date 4 issues have been published.

In January 2023, it was announced that the continuation of the TV-series, set between Babylon's Ashes and Persepolis Rising, would be adapted into a 12-issue comic book series, The Expanse: Dragon Tooth.

Board game
An Expanse board game, designed by Geoff Engelstein and published by WizKids, was released in October 2017. The authors of the book series collaborated with Engelstein on its development.
The game focuses on politics, conquest and intrigue similar to the board game Twilight Struggle, although with a shorter playing time. Players represent Earth's UN forces, the military of Mars, the O.P.A., and Protogen Inc, each struggling to become the dominant power in the Solar System. They use cards and action points to move and place Fleets and expand their Influence in contested areas. The cards represent characters and events from the universe of The Expanse, each bearing key images from the show. Each character has special abilities that must be correctly exploited in order to gain the upper hand in the struggle for control.

The Expanse: Doors & Corners Expansion has been announced for release by WizKids in February 2019. It contains five new modules that can be used independently or in any combination together with the base game.

Roleplaying game 
The Expanse Roleplaying Game uses the AGE (Adventure Game Engine) system designed by Chris Pramas to bring James S. A. Corey's universe to life. The core rulebook and Gamemaster's Kit launched on Kickstarter in July 2018 and gathered over $400,000 from their campaign. The book was written by game designer Steve Kenson and is published by Pramas' company Green Ronin Publishing. The game allows players to create their own character of the various Solar System factions and adventure through the Solar System and beyond at the various settings or even on their own ships. It includes a bonus short story by James S. A. Corey titled "The Last Flight of the Cassandra".

References

External links
 The-Expanse.com

Book series introduced in 2011
 
Artificial wormholes in fiction
American science fiction novels
Hard science fiction
Hugo Award-winning works
Fiction about main-belt asteroids
Fiction set on Mars
Science fiction novel series
Space opera novels
Fiction set on dwarf planets